Tom Budgen (born 19 May 1985) is a Dutch professional wrestler. He is currently signed to AEW, where he performs under the ring name Malakai Black and is one-third of the current AEW World Trios Champion alongside fellow House of Black members Brody King and Buddy Matthews in their first reign. He is also known for his time in WWE, where he performed as Aleister Black from 2017 to 2021.

Prior to signing with WWE, Budgen worked extensively under the ring name Tommy End for promotions across Europe, the United States, and Japan. He most notably wrestled for Insane Championship Wrestling (ICW), Progress Wrestling, Pro Wrestling Guerrilla (PWG), and Westside Xtreme Wrestling (wXw), holding numerous championships such as the wXw Unified World Heavyweight Championship, wXw World Lightweight Championship, wXw World Tag Team Championship, ICW Tag Team Championship, and Progress Tag Team Championship.

Budgen joined WWE's NXT brand in April 2017, debuting at NXT TakeOver: Orlando. He won the NXT Champion once and the Dusty Rhodes Tag Team Classic once (with Ricochet) before he was moved to the Raw brand, and was later drafted to the SmackDown brand. He then appeared sporadically before being released in 2021, and joined AEW a month later.

Early life
Tom Budgen was born in Alkmaar on 19 May 1985. He has an extensive background in martial arts, having trained in kickboxing, pencak silat, and muay thai, all of which he would later incorporate into his wrestling style.

Professional wrestling career

Independent circuit (2002–2016)

Under the ring name Tommy End, Budgen wrestled extensively on the European independent circuit starting with his debut on 18 June 2002, working for promotions such as Pro Wrestling Holland (PWH) and Pro Wrestling Showdown (PWS) in the Netherlands, Progress Wrestling and Revolution Pro Wrestling (RPW) in England, Insane Championship Wrestling (ICW) in Scotland, Over the Top Wrestling (OTT) in Ireland, and Westside Xtreme Wrestling (wXw) in Germany, among others. He also wrestled for Big Japan Pro Wrestling (BJW) in Japan and Combat Zone Wrestling (CZW), Evolve, and Pro Wrestling Guerrilla (PWG) in the United States. He held numerous championships and is a former wXw Unified World Heavyweight Champion, wXw World Light Heavyweight Champion, wXw World Tag Team Champion, ICW Tag Team Champion, and Progress Tag Team Champion.

WWE (2016–2021)

Early feuds (2016–2018)
In June 2016, it was reported that Budgen  had signed with WWE, and he reported to the WWE Performance Center on 19 October. On 7 January 2017, he debuted the new ring name, "Aleister Black". On 15 January, he made a surprise appearance as Tommy End at the United Kingdom Championship Tournament finals, losing to Neville in a non-tournament match.

Vignettes began to air from the 8 March episode of NXT, promoting Black's television debut. Black made his televised in-ring debut at NXT TakeOver: Orlando on 1 April, defeating Andrade "Cien" Almas. On 2 August episode of NXT, prior to Black's match, Hideo Itami cut a promo in the ring and demanding respect. Black interrupted Itami, resulting in a stand-off between the two, and then Black performed Black Mass on Itami. Itami attempted to attack Black afterwards, but the two were eventually separated. At NXT TakeOver: Brooklyn III, Black defeated Itami. Black then began a feud with Velveteen Dream, where Dream constantly stalked and harassed Black in order for him to say his name. This led to a match at NXT TakeOver: WarGames, which Black won. On 27 December episode of NXT, Black suffered his first pinfall loss by Johnny Gargano in a fatal-four-way match, after interference from The Undisputed Era (Adam Cole, Bobby Fish, and Kyle O'Reilly). At NXT TakeOver: Philadelphia on 27 January 2018, Black defeated Adam Cole in an Extreme Rules match.

NXT Champion (2018–2019)

On the 14 February episode of NXT, Black said that he had "a devil on [his] back", which was the NXT Championship, he was then interrupted by Killian Dain, whom he defeated on 7 March episode of NXT to become the number #1 contender for the NXT Championship. Black received his title opportunity against Andrade "Cien" Almas at NXT TakeOver: New Orleans on 7 April, where he defeated Almas to win the NXT Championship. On 30 May episode of NXT, Black was interrupted by Lars Sullivan, who wanted a shot at the NXT Championship. This led to a match at NXT TakeOver: Chicago II, where Black successfully retained his title. On 25 July episode of NXT, Black lost the NXT Championship to Tommaso Ciampa due to interference from Johnny Gargano, ending his reign at 108 days.

The following week on NXT, Black approached the ring, during Ciampa's address to the NXT Universe, only for Gargano to run out ahead of him to attack Ciampa, after which he attacked Gargano with a Black Mass before indicating that his NXT Championship loss was Gargano's fault. A match between the three for the title was scheduled for NXT TakeOver: Brooklyn 4, however, Black was later found unconscious in the parking lot outside the arena, after being attacked by an unseen and unknown assailant. It was later reported that Black was sent to a local medical facility, and was announced as being unable to compete. After being out of action for two months, Black returned on 17 October episode of NXT, confronting Nikki Cross, who revealed that Johnny Gargano was the one, who had attacked him. A match between Black and Gargano was scheduled for NXT TakeOver: WarGames, in which Black was victorious. At NXT TakeOver: Phoenix on 26 January 2019, Black failed to regain the NXT Championship from Tommaso Ciampa. The next night at the Royal Rumble, he entered the Royal Rumble match at number 21, but was  eliminated by Baron Corbin. In March, Black formed a tag team with Ricochet and the two competed in the 2019 Dusty Rhodes Tag Team Classic, which they won after defeating The Forgotten Sons (Steve Cutler and Wesley Blake) in the finals. At NXT TakeOver: New York on 5 April, Black and Ricochet unsuccessfully faced The War Raiders for the NXT Tag Team Championship.

Undefeated streak (2019–2020)
On 18 February 2019, Black made his official Raw debut, defeating Elias. Black also continued his team with Ricochet, and the duo competed in a Raw Tag Team Championship match at Fastlane that featured Bobby Roode and Chad Gable, and The Revival (Dash Wilder and Scott Dawson), but failed to win. Black and Ricochet also competed for the SmackDown Tag Team Championship in a fatal four-way match the following month at WrestleMania 35, but were again unsuccessful.

As part of the Superstar Shake-up on 15 April, Black was drafted to the Raw brand. However, on 22 April, Black was drafted to the SmackDown brand, due to his real-life wife Zelina Vega being drafted there, therefore splitting him from Ricochet. Black then began appearing in ominous backstage promos in a dark room, awaiting a challenger. On 9 July episode of SmackDown, his challenge was eventually accepted, with the mystery opponent to be revealed as Cesaro, who was Black's opponent at Extreme Rules in Black's first singles pay-per-view match since joining the main roster. At Extreme Rules on 14 July, Black defeated Cesaro.

As part of the 2019 Draft in October, Black was drafted to the Raw brand. Over the following weeks, Black would develop a winning streak, squashing his opponents. On 18 November episode of Raw, Buddy Murphy went to Black's locker room to challenge him, but Black was absent and Murphy claimed that Black was all talk and no fight. The following week, Black appeared and attacked Murphy after his match. A match between Black and Murphy was scheduled for TLC: Tables, Ladders & Chairs, which Black won. At the Royal Rumble pay-per-view on 26 January 2020, Black entered the Royal Rumble match at number 28, but was eliminated by Seth Rollins.

Final storylines (2020–2021)
On 24 February episode of Raw, Black was attacked by The O.C. (AJ Styles, Luke Gallows, and Karl Anderson) backstage. The next week on Raw, Black faced The O.C. members in separate matches, and suffered his first pinfall loss on the main roster, to AJ Styles. At Elimination Chamber on 8 March, Black defeated Styles in a no disqualification match, with interference from The Undertaker. At WrestleMania 36, on night two of the event, Black defeated Bobby Lashley after an accidental distraction by Lashley's manager and in-storyline wife Lana. On 20 April episode of Raw, Black defeated Austin Theory to qualify for the Money in the Bank ladder match at Money in the Bank. At the event, COVID-19 pandemic restraints forced the match to be changed to a cinematic match with a "Corporate Ladder" gimmick in which the titular briefcase was suspended above a ring on the roof of WWE's headquarters, with the competitors starting on the ground floor and fighting their way to the roof. Black failed to win the match, which was also notable for a sequence where Black and Rey Mysterio were thrown off the roof by Baron Corbin.

Following this, Black began a feud with Seth Rollins and Murphy after Rollins injured Rey Mysterio's eye. On 27 July episode of Raw, Murphy injured Black's right eye by driving it through the steel steps. On the 24 August episode of Raw, Black, now wearing an eye bandage, returned during The Kevin Owens Show and attacked Kevin Owens, turning heel for the first time in his career. The following week on Raw he attacked Owens again with his Black Mass finishing move before a match against Randy Orton which Owens lost. On the 14 September episode of Raw, Owens defeated Black. Owens would go on again to defeat Black, via disqualification, on the 28 September episode of Raw. On the 12 October episode of Raw, Black would lose again to Owens in a No Disqualification match, ending the feud. As part of the 2020 Draft in October, Black was drafted to the SmackDown brand. However, following the draft, Black would disappear from television for six months. After his absence, he returned on the 23 April 2021 episode of SmackDown in a vignette promoting his return. After several weeks of vignettes, Black officially returned on the 21 May episode of SmackDown, attacking Big E with the Black Mass which allowed Apollo Crews to retain the Intercontinental Championship in the main event. Black was originally planned to feud with Big E as a result, but was released by WWE on 2 June.

All Elite Wrestling (2021–present) 

On the special 7 July 2021 episode of AEW Dynamite entitled Road Rager, Budgen made his debut for All Elite Wrestling (AEW) under the ring name Malakai Black, attacking both Arn Anderson and Cody Rhodes with the Black Mass, confirming his status as a heel. During the special Homecoming episode of Dynamite on 4 August, Black made his in-ring AEW debut defeating Rhodes. After the match, Black attacked Rhodes once again, laying him out after hitting him in the back with a crutch. Black would face Rhodes in a rematch at Grand Slam on 22 September, defeating him once again.

In early 2022, Black began feuding with the Varsity Blonds (Brian Pillman Jr. and Griff Garrison) and the Death Triangle (Pac and Penta El Zero Miedo). On the 12 January 2022 edition of Dynamite, Brody King debuted and joined Black, forming a tag team called the Kings of the Black Throne which later expanded into a larger faction called the House of Black. On the 23 February edition of Dynamite, Buddy Matthews made his debut as the third House of Black member. At Revolution's buy-in show, the House of Black would win in a trios match against the team of the Death Triangle and Erick Redbeard, with Black pinning Redbeard for the victory. At Double or Nothing, Julia Hart would join the group after helping them beat the Death Triangle (Pac, Penta Oscuro and Rey Fenix) in a six-man tag team match.

At Revolution on March 5 2023, The House of Black defeated The Elite (Kenny Omega, Matt Jackson, and Nick Jackson) to become the AEW World Trios Championship.

Return to the independent circuit (2021–present) 
Budgen, as Malakai Black, returned to Pro Wrestling Guerrilla (PWG) during its Mystery Vortex 7 event in August 2021. Along with his Kings of the Black Throne teammate Brody King, he saved PWG World Champion Bandido from a beating at the hands of Black Taurus, Demonic Flamita, and Super Dragon. Black later announced that he would be appearing at PWG's upcoming Threemendous show. At that event, the Kings of the Black Throne defeated Flamita and Black Taurus for the vacant PWG World Tag Team Championship.

Other media 
Budgen (under the Aleister Black name) is a playable character in the video games WWE 2K18, WWE 2K19, and WWE 2K20.

Personal life 
On 23 November, 2018, Budgen married American professional wrestler Zelina Vega. They reside in Tampa, Florida.

Championships and accomplishments 

Adriatic Special Combat Academy
Super 8 Cup II (2013)
All Elite Wrestling
AEW World Trios Championship (1 time, current) – with Brody King and Buddy Matthews
Catch Wrestling Norddeutschland
CWN Mittelgewichtsmeisterschaft (1 time)
Fiend Wrestling Germany
 FWG Lightweight Championship (1 time)
 FWG Lightweight Title Tournament (2009)
Fight Club: PRO
 FCP Championship (1 time)
Freestyle Championship Wrestling
 FCW Deutschland Lightweight Championship (1 time) 
Insane Championship Wrestling
 ICW Tag Team Championship (1 time) – with Michael Dante
 ICW "Match of the Year" Bammy Award (2015) – 
International Catch Wrestling Alliance
 ICWA Heavyweight Championship (1 time)
 ICWA World Junior Heavyweight Champion (1 time)
ICWA European Tag Team Championship/NWA European Tag Team Championship (1 time) – with Michael Dante
 Pro Wrestling Guerrilla
 PWG World Tag Team Championship (1 time, current) – with Brody King
Pro Wrestling Holland
 PWH Tag Team Championship (1 time) – with Michael Dante
Pro Wrestling Illustrated
Ranked No. 23 of the top 500 singles wrestlers in the PWI 500 in 2020
Pro Wrestling Showdown
 PWS Heavyweight Championship (1 time)
Progress Wrestling
Progress Tag Team Championship (1 time) – with Michael Dante
 Super Strong Style 16 (2016)
Southside Wrestling Entertainment
 SWE Tag Team Championship (1 time) – with Michael Dante
Westside Xtreme Wrestling
wXw Unified World Wrestling Championship (1 time)
 wXw World Lightweight Championship (2 times)
 wXw World Tag Team Championship (2 times) – with Michael Dante
 wXw 16 Carat Gold Tournament (2013, 2015)
 Chase The Mahamla (2011)
 World Lightweight Tournament (2006)
 WWE
 NXT Championship (1 time)
 NXT Year-End Award (3 times)
 Male Competitor of the Year (2017)
 Breakout Star of the Year (2017)
 Rivalry of the Year (2017) – 
 Dusty Rhodes Tag Team Classic (2019) – with Ricochet

References

External links

 
 
 
 
 
 

1985 births
All Elite Wrestling personnel
Dutch atheists
Dutch expatriate sportspeople in the United States
Dutch male professional wrestlers
Expatriate professional wrestlers
Living people
NXT Champions
Sportspeople from Alkmaar
Twitch (service) streamers
Dutch male kickboxers
Dutch Muay Thai practitioners
21st-century professional wrestlers
PWG World Tag Team Champions
The House of Black members
PROGRESS Tag Team Champions